Big Band is a 1954 album by Charlie Parker of sides recorded in 1950 and 1952. In 1999 Big Band was reissued with bonus material and outtakes.

Reception

Stacia Proefrock reviewed the reissue of the album for Allmusic and wrote that these "Though Joe Lipman's arrangements are stellar, the musicians assembled for the sessions are an odd mix of Popular Music big-band players and improvisers. The album en todo also suffers from the Popular Music style of the songs themselves: solos are kept short, and songs limited to a three-minute length that was both radio-friendly and compatible with the 78-rpm format. But when Parker does solo, it is just as magical as any of his earlier recordings. The songs also have a sweet smoothness to them that makes them eminently enjoyable although jazz variety is lacking. This record is not perfect, but it still musters up moments of brilliance".

Track listing 
 "Temptation" (Nacio Herb Brown, Arthur Freed) – 3:33
 "Autumn in New York" (Vernon Duke) – 3:31
 "Lover" (Lorenz Hart, Richard Rodgers) – 3:08
 "Stella by Starlight" (Ned Washington, Victor Young) – 2:58
 "Dancing in the Dark" (Howard Dietz, Arthur Schwartz) – 3:16
 "Night and Day" (Cole Porter) – 2:52
 "I Can't Get Started" (Vernon Duke, Ira Gershwin, Thad Jones) – 3:10
 "What Is This Thing Called Love?" (Porter) – 2:39
 "Almost Like Being in Love" (Alan Jay Lerner, Frederick Loewe) – 2:38
 "Laura" (Johnny Mercer, David Raksin) – 3:09
 "In the Still of the Night" (Porter) – 3:28
 "Old Folks" (Dedette Lee Hill, Willard Robison) – 3:38
 "If I Love Again" (Jack Murray, Ben Oakland) – 2:38
Bonus Tracks; Issued on the 1999 Verve CD Reissue, Verve 5598352 
"In the Still of the Night" – 3:53
 "In the Still of the Night" – 3:31
 "In the Still of the Night" – 3:36
 "Old Folks" – 4:12
 "Old Folks" – 3:37
 "Old Folks" – 3:41
 "In the Still of the Night" – 1:27
 "In the Still of the Night" – 0:45
 "Old Folks" – 0:46
 "Old Folks" – 0:39
 "Old Folks" – 0:29

Personnel 
Charlie Parker – alto saxophone
Gil Evans, Joe Lipman – arranger, conductor
Ray Brown, Charles Mingus, Bob Haggart – double bass
Manny Thaler – bassoon
Maurice Brown – cello
Hal McKusick – clarinet
Buddy Rich, Max Roach, Don Lamond – drums
Stanley Webb – flute, oboe, baritone saxophone
Al Block – flute
Junior Collins, Joseph Singer – french horn
Oscar Peterson – piano
Flip Phillips – tenor saxophone
Will Bradley – trombone, trumpet
Freddie Green, Art Ryerson – guitar
Verlye Mills – harp
Tommy Mace – oboe
Tony Aless, Bernie Leighton, Lou Stein – piano
Nuncio "Toots" Mondello, Murray Williams – alto saxophone, woodwind
Harry Terrill – alto saxophone
Danny Bank – baritone saxophone
Art Drelinger, Hank Ross –  tenor saxophone, woodwind
Bill Harris, Lou McGarity – trombone
Chris Griffin, Jimmy Maxwell, Bernie Pivin, Carl Poole, Al Porcino – trumpet
Isadore Zir – viola
Howard Kay, Harry Melnikoff, Samuel Rand, Sylvan Shulman, Zelly Smirnoff, Jack Zayde – violin
Dave Lambert – vocals
Production
Norman Granz – producer
Cynthia Sesso – photo research
Herman Leonard – photography
Hollis King – art direction
Sherniece Smith – art producer
Sheryl Lutz-Brown – design
Bill Kirchner – liner notes
Tom Greenwood, Carlos Kase – production assistant
Bryan Koniarz – production coordination
Ben Young – research, restoration, supervisor

References

1954 albums
Albums arranged by Gil Evans
Albums produced by Norman Granz
Charlie Parker albums
Clef Records albums